Marianne Thornton (10 March 1797 – 5 November 1887) was an English human rights activist, who campaigned for the abolition of slavery.

Marianne Thornton was the eldest of nine children of the philanthropist, economist and abolitionist Henry Thornton (1760–1815) and his wife Marianne Sykes (1765–1815). Her father, MP for Southwark, was, with William Wilberforce, a member of the Clapham Sect, an influential evangelical group within the Church of England dedicated to social reform. The Clapham Saints, as they were called, shared common political and social views concerning the liberation of slaves, the abolition of the slave trade and the reform of the penal system, amongst other social justice issues.

After the early death of both parents in 1815, she and her siblings were brought up by a family friend, the politician Sir Robert Inglis. She spent most of her life in Clapham, Her social circle included Hannah More.

Marianne Thornton was the paternal great-aunt of the novelist E. M. Forster, to whom she bequeathed the sum of £8,000 (the equivalent of about £990,000 in 2017) as a legacy in trust. Forster published a detailed biography of her in 1956, bringing her life to national attention.

Her parents became characters in the 2006 biographical film Amazing Grace. The title refers to the  famous poem and song written by the reformed slave trader and founder of Clapham Saints, John Newton.

External links
 
 
 Personal page at The Peerage.com

References

1797 births
1887 deaths
People from Clapham
Clapham Sect
English abolitionists
British reformers
British social reformers